Zedelgem is a municipality located in the Belgian province of West Flanders. The municipality comprises the villages of Aartrijke, Loppem, Veldegem and Zedelgem proper. On January 1, 2019, Zedelgem had a total population of 22,813.

Zedelgem and the surrounding area was home to a prisoner-of-war camp towards the end of World War II. Although the camp was disbanded and prisoners released after the war, the site remained military domain until 1994. It is now a nature park.

Notable people
  (1902–1994), writer.

See also
 New Holland Agriculture

Gallery

References

External links

 
Zedelgem POW Camp

Municipalities of West Flanders